Cosmospora is a genus of ascomycete fungi in the family Nectriaceae. The genus, as circumscribed by Rossman et al. (1998), included all the nectrioid species with small, reddish, non-ornamented sexual fruiting bodies that collapse laterally when dry. However, the genus was shown to be polyphyletic, and the majority of species were re-classified into revived or recently established genera that are monophyletic. Cosmospora sensu Rossman housed members of the following genera: Chaetopsina, Cylindrocladiella, Fusicolla, Macroconia, Mariannaea, Microcera, Pseudocosmospora, Stylonectria, and Volutella. Cosmospora was restricted to species having acremonium-like asexual morphs that grow on polypores and xylariaceous fungi.

The name Cosmospora comes from Greek kosmos + spora, meaning ornamented spores.

Species

Cosmospora
Cosmospora coccinea
Cosmospora arxii
Cosmospora berkeleyana
Cosmospora butyri
Cosmospora cymosa
Cosmospora khandalensis
Cosmospora lavitskiae
Cosmospora viliuscula
Cosmospora viridescens
Chaetopsina
Chaetopsina fulva
Chaetopsina penicillata
Chaetopsina polyblastia
Cylindrocladiella
Cylindrocladiella microcylindrica
Dialonectria
Dialonectria episphaeria
Fusicolla
Fusicolla matuoi
Macroconia
Macroconia leptosphaeriae
Macroconia cupularis
Macroconia gigas
Macroconia papilionacearum
Mariannaea
Mariannaea catenulatae
Microcera
Microcera coccophila
Microcera diploa
Microcera larvarum
Pseudocosmospora
Pseudocosmospora joca
Pseudocosmospora metepisphaeria
Pseudocosmospora pseudepisphaeria
Pseudocosmospora triqua
Pseudocosmospora vilior
Stylonectria
Stylonectria purtonii
Stylonectria wegeliniana
Volutella
Volutella consors
Volutella citrinella
Incertae sedis
Cosmospora biasolettiana
Cosmospora chlorina
Cosmospora damingshanica
Cosmospora digitalicola
Cosmospora diminuta
Cosmospora dingleyae
Cosmospora effusa
Cosmospora geastroides
Cosmospora glabra
Cosmospora henanensis
Cosmospora hispanica
Cosmospora japonica
Cosmospora jucundula
Cosmospora kurdica
Cosmospora lasiodiplodiae
Cosmospora macrochaetopsinae
Cosmospora marelliana
Cosmospora meliopsicola
Cosmospora nothepisphaeria
Cosmospora nummulariae
Cosmospora obscura
Cosmospora peponum
Cosmospora pseudoflavoviridis
Cosmospora purpureocolla
Cosmospora rickii
Cosmospora rubrisetosa
Cosmospora sansevieriae
Cosmospora stegonsporii
Cosmospora stilbosporae
Cosmospora thujana
Cosmospora tungurahuana

References

External links
 

Nectriaceae genera